Crematorio is a Spanish TV series written and directed by Jorge Sánchez-Cabezudo. It is based on Rafael Chirbes's novel of the same name. It was produced by MOD Producciones for Canal+.

Plot summary

Crematorio is the story of the Bertomeus, a family that has managed to amass a great fortune over several generations. Rubén Bertomeu left agricultural businesses behind to create a business network that has made him the richest and most powerful man in Misent. Only in the family environment Rubén Bertomeu finds opposition to his way of understanding progress.

Cast and characters

Main cast 

José Sancho is Rubén Bertomeu, a wealthy real estate developer heading a huge project called Costa Azul, which includes miles of coastline. He has made a fortune in recent years, but at the limits of what is considered legal.
Alicia Borrachero is Silvia Bertomeu, Rubén's daughter, who runs a gallery and lives separate from the darker side of her father's business.
Juana Acosta is Mónica, Rubén's 29-year-old lover, who uses her looks to get what she wants.
Aura Garrido is Miriam, Silvia's 18-year-old daughter who studies at a prestigious London university, paid for by her grandfather Rubén.
Montserrat Carulla is Teresa, Rubén's mother, who had a closer relationship with Matias, Ruben's recently diseased brother.
Pau Durà is Zarrategui, the Bertomeu's family lawyer, who has spies in the police force and in other organisations so that the company manages to stay one step ahead.
Vicente Romero is Sarcós, the man who does Ruben's dirty work.
Pep Tosar is Collado, Ruben's former right-hand man, who now works for himself in a small business and begins to have problems with his former boss.
Vlad Ivanov is Traian, a Russian who has made money with Ruben's previous projects and is determined that Ruben's family have no negative effect on future undertakings.

Reception

Critical response
The series is rated as one of the best in the history of Spanish television. Manuel Cuesta of El Almería especially praised the performance of Pepe Sancho, claiming it gave the show credibility and glamour, and described it as the actor's best work.

Variety described Crematorio as a "withering social portrait of modern Spain" and suggested that the series represented part of "a talent influx from cinema into TV production" in Spain.

The show was acquired by Netflix in August 2017.

Episodes

Awards and nominations

References 
Citations

Bibliography
 

2011 Spanish television series debuts
2011 Spanish television series endings
Television series about organized crime
2010s Spanish drama television series
Television series based on Spanish novels
Television series by MOD Producciones